Desislava Velcheva Stoeva, better known as Dzhina Stoeva (born 6 September 1976) is a Bulgarian pop folk and folk singer

Biography
Desislava Stoeva was born in Ruse, Bulgaria.

In 2000 she signed contract with Ara Music. In 2001 was released first album Любов моя.

In 2014, her second folklore album Чашо моя was released.
In 2015 she left from Ara Music and switched to an independent label

On 28 February 2017, she gave birth to her daughter, Ivaia.

Discography

Studio albums 
Любов моя (My Love, 2001)
Така желана (So Desirable, 2003)
Изкушение (Temptation, 2007)
Пиринско слънце (Pirin Sun, 2008)
Неизлечимо влюбена (Inlerably In Love, 2009)
Чашо моя (My Glass, 2014)

Compilations 
The Best of Jina Stoeva – The Nightmare (2012)

References

1976 births
Living people
21st-century Bulgarian women singers
Bulgarian folk-pop singers
Bulgarian folk singers
People from Ruse, Bulgaria